The 2008 Geelong Football Club season was the club's 109th season in the Australian Football League (AFL). Geelong finished the regular season in first position on the ladder, earning the club a second-consecutive McClelland Trophy, and its ninth overall. Geelong's regular season record was impressive (21 wins, 1 loss), the best performance of a team in the home-and-away season since Essendon Football Club in 2000. Geelong then went on to win its Qualifying and Preliminary finals in succession, earning a place in the 2008 AFL Grand Final against Hawthorn, and the chance for a second-consecutive premiership. However, Geelong failed to capitalise on its outstanding performance during the season, losing the premiership in a Grand Final thriller.

Geelong signed up a club record 36,850 club members for the season, and had an average home crowd attendance of 43,176, also a club record.

Season overview

Geelong did well in the home and away season and finished four games and percentage clear on top of the ladder. It was an outstanding season with the team winning 21 out of the 22 games & finished with a percentage of 161.84, the only loss was to Collingwood in round 9 by a massive 86 points.
With the team widely considered to be premiership favorites the Cats were almost unbackable favourites to win the 2008 AFL premiership. They beat St Kilda in the first qualifying final 17.17(119) to 8.13(61). A 29-point win over the Western Bulldogs in the preliminary final secured the Cats a grand final a berth against Hawthorn.

Geelong were defeated in the 2008 AFL Grand Final by Hawthorn in front of an attendance of 100,012 people. Despite having numerous chances in the first half of the game, and dominating through the midfield, the Cats failed to convert and were defeated by the Hawks.

Captains
 Captain: Tom Harley
 Vice-captain: Cameron Ling
 Deputy vice-captain: Cameron Mooney

Club List

Player List

Rookie List

Changes from 2007 List

Additions
 Exchange period – received:
None
 Rookie elevation:
 Tom Lonergan
 Jason Davenport

 Father/son selection:
 Adam Donohue

 NAB AFL Draft (24 November 2007):
 Harry Taylor (Round 1; Overall pick 17; from East Fremantle) 
 Dawson Simpson (Round 2; Overall pick 34; from Murray Bushrangers)
 Scott Simpson (Round 3; Overall pick 44; from Dandenong Stingrays)
 Dan McKenna (Round 3; Overall pick 50; from Gippsland Power)
 Adam Donohue (Round 4; Overall pick 60; from Geelong Falcons)

 NAB AFL Pre-Season Draft (11 December 2007):
None
 NAB AFL Rookie Draft (11 December 2007):
 Brodie Moles (Round 1; Overall pick 16; from Tasmania) 
 Jeremy Laidler (Round 2; Overall pick 32; from Calder U18) 
 Chris Kangars (Round 3; Overall pick 46; from Geelong U18) 
 Shane Mumford (Round 4; Overall pick 57; from Geelong VFL)

Deletions
 Exchange period – traded:
 Steven King and Charlie Gardiner –  (received St Kilda's Round 6 draft selection – No.90)

 Delisted:
 Joel Reynolds
 Matthew Spencer
 Sam Hunt
 Stephen Owen
 Todd Grima

 Retirements:
None

Games

Exhibition and Trial Games

NAB Cup

Premiership season

Finals

See also
 2008 AFL season
 Geelong Football Club

References

External links
 Official website of the Geelong Football Club
 Official website of the Australian Football League 
 2008 season scores and results at AFL Tables
 2008 Geelong player statistics at AFL Tables

2008 in Australian rules football
2008
2008 Australian Football League season